Poissonia is a genus of flowering plants in the legume family, Fabaceae. It belongs to the subfamily Faboideae.

References

Robinieae
Taxa named by Henri Ernest Baillon
Fabaceae genera